Glen Campbell Plays 12 String Guitar contains instrumental-only songs, the majority of which were taken from The Swinging 12 String originally released by The In Group featuring Glen Campbell on twelve string guitar and Leon Russell on harpsichord.

Track listing
Side 1:

 "Cottonfields" (Folkways BMI) - 2:30
 "The Man With The Golden Gun" (Bond) - 2:25
 "Walk Right In" (Cannon, Woods) - 2:17
 "Gospel Harp" (Bond) - 2:07
 "Country Shindig" (Public Domain arr. Davon Music BMI) - 2:30

Side 2:

 "Greenback Dollar" (Axton, Ramsey) - 2:00
 "If I Had a Hammer" (Lee Hays, Pete Seeger) - 2:50
 "Cherry Beat" (Bond) - 2:35
 "Greenfields" (Gilkyson, Dehr, Miller) - 2:20
 "Shindig Hoot" (Public Domain arr. Davon Music BMI) - 2:17

References

1960s compilation albums
Glen Campbell compilation albums
1966 albums